Mayuto Correa (born 9 March 1943) is a Brazilian percussionist, guitarist, and composer.

Life and career
Correa was born in São Gonçalo, Rio de Janeiro and began playing in local bands from the age of 12 when he became a member of the big band Rapazes da Alvorada. At age 16 he formed the ensemble Samba Show with musicians from Niterói and made several recordings for the CBS label with them. He also played for the under-17 squad of the Brazil national football team. In the 1960s Correa was the artistic director of Pontifical Catholic University of Rio de Janeiro where he wrote and directed several plays. During this time, he also made several recordings in Brazil and worked as the musical director for the shows of Maria Bethânia, Elza Soares, and Eliana Pittman as well as playing in Roberto Carlos's ensemble RC-7 and performing in Chacrinha's television shows.

In 1969 he left Brazil for Mexico where he worked with the Brazilian bossa nova group Tamba 4 before moving to the United States. He established himself as a musician in Los Angeles in the early 1970s.  According to jazz writer Leonard Feather, Correa had become "a vital figure in hundreds of major and minor albums taped in Los Angeles" by 1977. During that period he also toured live with many of the artists with whom he recorded and became the record producer for the Argentine group Arco Iris. He returned to Brazil in 1972 when he was touring with Carlos Santana and again in 1979 when he appeared on the Rede Globo television show Sexta Super.

Among his compositions is the soundtrack for the 1979 documentary Homeboys depicting Chicano youth gang culture in East Los Angeles. In the later years of his career, Correa has performed with his bands Mayuto & Genuises 2000, Mayuto & The Dream Team Big Band, and Mayuto & Samba Pack. He has also had small acting roles in the film Redeemed (2014) and the television series Community (2015).

Discography

Correa's extensive discography as a percussionist includes:
José José's debut studio album José José (1969). Label: RCA Victor
Paulo Moura's Pilantrocracia (1971). Label: Equipe
Howard Roberts's Equinox Express Elevator (1972). Label: Impulse! Records
Charles Lloyd's Waves (1972). Label: A&M Records
Nat Adderley's Soul of the Bible (1972). Label: Capitol Records
Cannonball Adderley's The Happy People (1972). Label: Capitol Records 
Cal Tjader and Charlie Byrd's Tambu (1973). Label: Fantasy Records
Cal Tjader's Last Bolero In Berkeley (1973). Label: Fantasy Records
Etta James's Come a Little Closer (1974). Label: Bellaphon Records 
Goldie Zelkowitz's Goldie Zelkowitz (1974). Label: Bellaphon Records 
Miriam Makeba's A Promise (1974). Label: Amiga Records 
Gábor Szabó's Live With Charles Lloyd (1974). Label: Blue Thumb Records
Gato Barbieri's  Chapter Two: Hasta Siempre (1974). Label: Impulse! Records
Kenny Burrell's Up the Street, 'Round the Corner, Down the Block (1974). Label: Fantasy Records
Ray Manzarek's The Golden Scarab (1974). Label: Mercury Records
Moacir Santos 's Saudade (1974). Label: Blue Note Records
Donald Byrd's Stepping into Tomorrow (1974). Label: Blue Note Records
Kenny Rankin's Inside (1975). Label: Little David Records
Henry Mancini & His Concert Orchestra's Symphonic Soul (1975). Label: RCA Victor Records
Jon Lucien's Song For My Lady (1975). Label: Columbia Records
Freddie Hubbard's Liquid Love (1975). Label: Columbia Records
Richard "Groove" Holmes's Six Million Dollar Man (1975). Label: Flying Dutchman Records
The Waters's Waters (1975). Label: Blue Note Records
Yvonne Elliman 's Small Town Talk (1975). Label: RSO Records
Shelly Manne's Hot Coles (1975). Label: RCA Victor, Flying Dutchman Records
John Prine's Common Sense (1975). Label: Atlantic Records
Donald Byrd's Places and Spaces (1975). Label: Blue Note Records
David Axelrod's Seriously Deep (1975). Label: Polydor Records
Bobbi Humphrey's Fancy Dancer (1975). Label: Blue Note Records
Donald Byrd's Caricatures (1976). Label: Blue Note Records
Gene Harris's In a Special Way (1976). Label: Blue Note Records
Les Dudek's debut solo album Les Dudek (1976). Label: Columbia Records
James Vincent's Space Traveler (1976). Label: Caribou Records
Jorge Calderón's City Music (1976). Label: Warner Bros. Records
John Prine's The Best Of John Prine (1976). Label: Atlantic Records
Johnny Hammond's Forever Taurus (1976). Label: Milestone Records
David Axelrod's Strange Ladies (1977). Label: MCA Records
Keni Burke's debut solo album Keni Burke (1977). Label: Dark Horse Records
Syreeta's One To One (1977). Label: Tamla Records
Burt Bacharach's Woman (1978). Label: A&M Records
Jerry Lynn Williams's Easy On Yourself (Gone) (1979). Label: Warner Bros. Records
Ronnie Laws's Mr. Nice Guy (1983). Label: Capitol Records
Various Blue Break Beats (Volume 3) (1996). Label: Blue Note Records
Gato Barbieri's Latino America  (1997). Label: Impulse Records
Various Blue Break Beats (Volumes 1) (1999). Label: Blue Note Records
Various Jazz Samba Vol. 2 (1999). Label: ZYX Music Records
Jon Lucien's Motherland (1999). Label: Razor & Tie Records
Jazz Crusaders's Life In The City ( (2000). Label: Indigo Blue Records
Various Brazilian Flavour  (2000). Label: Fantasy Records
Various Gourmet Music Deluxe: Brazil (2001). Label: ZYX Music Records
Various The Latin Tinge Series: Brazilian Flavour 2  (2002). Label: Fantasy Records
Various Champagne Lounge(Weinwelt Edition) (2004). Label: Ayia Napa Records
Howard Roberts's Antelope Freeway  (2011). Label: Impulse Records
Various Uncompromising Expression (2014). Label: Blue Note Records

References

External links

Official YouTube channel
Mayuto Correa credits on AllMusic
Mayuto Correa's profile on All About Jazz

1943 births
Living people
Brazilian jazz percussionists